Franciscus Buratti (born 1582) was a Roman Catholic prelate who served as Bishop of Vulturara e Montecorvino (1623).

Biography
Franciscus Buratti was born in 1582 and ordained a priest in the Order of Preachers. On 10 May 1623, he was appointed during the papacy of Pope Gregory XV as Bishop of Vulturara e Montecorvino. On 21 May 1623, he was consecrated bishop by Marco Antonio Gozzadini, Cardinal-Priest of Sant'Eusebio, with Virgilio Cappone, Bishop of Mileto, and Alessandro Bosco, Bishop of Gerace, serving as co-consecrators. He was replaced as Bishop of Vulturara e Montecorvino in the same year as his appointment by Tommaso Carafa.

See also 
Catholic Church in Italy

References

External links and additional sources 
 (for Chronology of Bishops) 
 (for Chronology of Bishops) 

17th-century Italian Roman Catholic bishops
1582 births
Bishops appointed by Pope Gregory XV
Dominican bishops